AKM Asadul Haq was a Bangladeshi physician and an army officer in Pakistan Army who was killed in the Bangladesh Liberation war and is considered a martyr in Bangladesh.

Early life
Haq was born on 1 December 1928 Santoshpur, Sandwip Upazila, Chittagong District, East Bengal, British Raj. He graduated from Kathghar High School in 1944 and from Chittagong College in 1946. He completed his MBBS from Dhaka Medical College in 1952. He was harassed by police during his internship in Dhaka Medical College for treating protesters injured in the 1952 Language Movement.

Career
In 1953 Haq joined the Pakistan Army Medical Corps. He completed his FCPS in Quetta, West Pakistan and FRCS from the Royal College of Physicians and Surgeons in 1962. From 1956 to 1970 he served in various Combined Military Hospitals of Pakistan Army including in Abbottabad Cantonment, Bagh, Azad Kashmir, Jessore Cantonment, Multan Cantonment, and Sargodha Cantonment. In 1970 he was appointed commanding officer of the Armed Forces Medical Store Depot in Chittagong Cantonment.

Death
Haq was arrested along with his family after the start of Operation Searchlight by Pakistan Army on 25 March 1971. They were imprisoned inside the Combined Medical Hospital. He along with some other Bengali Army officers were executed by Pakistan Army on 17 April 1971.

References

1928 births
1971 deaths
People killed in the Bangladesh Liberation War
People from Sandwip Upazila
Bangladeshi military doctors
Dhaka Medical College alumni